Djibouti–Ethiopia relations are bilateral relations between Djibouti and Ethiopia. Both countries are members of the African Union, Group of 77 and Non-Aligned Movement.

History
Diplomatic relations between the two countries was established in 1984. Relations between the countries are generally good. Both countries share ownership of the Addis Ababa-Djibouti Railroad; however, this utility is in need of repairs and upgraded capacity. The railroad is tied to the Port of Djibouti, which provides port facilities and trade ties to landlocked Ethiopia. Disputes between the Afar and Issa people of Djibouti have the potential of involving Ethiopian citizens of these groups.

References

 
Ethiopia
Djibouti